Bharwain is a hill station situated in Amb Tehsil and hill hamlet village in Chintpurni region in the Una district of the state of Himachal Pradesh in India. It is an entry point to the Chintpurni Temple. The area is situated between the western Himalaya in the north and the Shiwalik (or Shivalik) range bordering the state of Punjab.

Description 

Bharwain is situated at a distance of about 2 km from the Chintpurni Shakti Peeth Temple on the Hoshiarpur Dharmshala highway. 
Bharwain is an administrative seat as well, as it is a sub-tehsil  under the Amb block. 
Bharwain is also a PWD circle that covers many blocks of the Una district. This place borders the Kangra district to the north.

Attractions 

There is a lot to see and do in and around Bharwain:

Temples
Chintpurni temple
Various temples in Thaneek Pura

Structures
PWD guest house building

Bazaar
Bharwain bazar is on the main road.
Chaat bazar in Thaneek Pura

Hotels
Hotel Chintpurni Heights by H.P.T.D.C.
Yatri Bhavan by Chintpurni Temple Trust

Activities
Forest Camping
Nature Walk and Trekking

Location
Bharwain is situated at the altitude of around 1000 meters and is part of the Una district, Himachal Pradesh. It is located on the Hoshiarpur-Dharmashala road. This road is part of the State Highway network.

Weather

Spring : About mid-February to mid-April. The winter starts losing its bite around mid-February.

Summer : Mid-April to end of June. It is hot in summer and light cottons are recommended.

Rainy season : July - September. Still quite warm and, of course, humid. Very rainy.

Autumn : October - November. Days are pleasantly warm, nights are cool. May need light woollens at night or early mornings.

Winter: December - January. It is quite pleasant during the day and you may get by with one layer of woollens. The winter nights are cold and an extra layer of woollens is required.

In general, temperatures in Bharwain, Chintpurni are about 5-8 Celsius lower than in the Punjab and Haryana plains and in Delhi.

References

External links
 Thaneek Pura
 Chintpurni

Villages in Una district
Tourism in Himachal Pradesh
Tehsils of Himachal Pradesh